Myrmedophila is a genus of silken fungus beetles in the family Cryptophagidae. There is one described species in Myrmedophila, M. americana.

References

Further reading

 
 
 

Cryptophagidae
Articles created by Qbugbot